is a Japanese television comedian.

He is most famous as one half of the owarai duo Bakushō Mondai along with Yūji Tanaka, where he acts as the boke. He was born in Kamifukuoka, Saitama.

Unique character 
Ōta is known for his strained, long-winded speeches, though it is perhaps his profound and sometimes dangerous comments that make him a staple of modern Japanese entertainment, and reflect his rather remarkable personality. As a boke, one is generally expected to fulfill a more ignorant comedy role, but Ōta's boke has him frequently overstepping classical boundaries into new and often controversial territories, often prompting Tanaka (as the tsukkomi) to bring him back down to reality. Ōta is a bibliophile—reportedly reading over 100 books a year—and some of his favorite authors include Kurt Vonnegut, John Irving, J. D. Salinger, and Osamu Dazai (of whom Ōta's father was a student), many of them holding some similitude to his often absurdist view of the world.

His opinions almost never synch with Tanaka's, that is to say, he often avoids agreeing with Tanaka by intentionally taking the opposing side simply out of spite, making their boke/tsukkomi relationship much more lively, and perhaps realistic.

He is an active essayist and has published a number of collections.

Literary career
In 2010, Ōta published his first fictional literary work, a collection of short stories, "Maboroshi no Tori" (マボロシの鳥 / Legendary Bird) which he followed with a novel "Bunmei No Ko" (文明の子 / Child of Civilisation) in 2012.

Now showing
Ōta has recently found a niche for his relatively extremist and sometimes ridiculous world views as the main speaker in the Nippon TV show, Hikari Ōta's If I Were Prime Minister... Secretary Tanaka, where he acts as the Japanese Prime Minister and addresses various social problems with his own style of radical solutions. The guests of the show often include high-profile members of the Japanese Diet and famous Japanese of various backgrounds.

Ōta also voiced Sid the Sloth in the Japanese dubbed version of the computer-animated franchise Ice Age.

Awards

References

External links
 "Pushing the Boundaries of Political Satire in Japan" August 12, 2006 The New York Times 
Bakushō Mondai's profile 

1965 births
Living people
People from Saitama Prefecture
Japanese comedians